Bojan Marković (Serbian Cyrillic: Бојан Марковић; born 12 November 1985) is a Bosnian professional footballer who plays as a centre-back. He most recently played for FIrst League of RS club Zvijezda 09.

Honours
Borac Banja Luka 
Republika Srpska Cup: 2011–12

References

External links

1985 births
Living people
Sportspeople from Zenica
Serbs of Bosnia and Herzegovina
Association football central defenders
Bosnia and Herzegovina footballers
FK Rudar Ugljevik players
NK Čelik Zenica players
PFC Spartak Nalchik players
Panserraikos F.C. players
FK Borac Banja Luka players
Hapoel Be'er Sheva F.C. players
Ravan Baku FC players
FK Mladost Velika Obarska players
FC Politehnica Iași (2010) players
FK Slavija Sarajevo players
KF Teuta Durrës players
Ruch Chorzów players
FK Mladost Doboj Kakanj players
FK Zvijezda 09 players
Premier League of Bosnia and Herzegovina players
Super League Greece players
Israeli Premier League players
Azerbaijan Premier League players
Liga I players
Kategoria Superiore players
I liga players
First League of the Republika Srpska players
Bosnia and Herzegovina expatriate footballers
Expatriate footballers in Russia
Bosnia and Herzegovina expatriate sportspeople in Russia
Expatriate footballers in Greece
Bosnia and Herzegovina expatriate sportspeople in Greece
Expatriate footballers in Israel
Bosnia and Herzegovina expatriate sportspeople in Israel
Expatriate footballers in Azerbaijan
Bosnia and Herzegovina expatriate sportspeople in Azerbaijan
Expatriate footballers in Romania
Bosnia and Herzegovina expatriate sportspeople in Romania
Expatriate footballers in Albania
Bosnia and Herzegovina expatriate sportspeople in Albania
Expatriate footballers in Poland
Bosnia and Herzegovina expatriate sportspeople in Poland